Adam Doueihi (born 5 August 1998) is a Lebanese international rugby league footballer who plays as a  or  for the Wests Tigers in the NRL. 

He previously played for the South Sydney Rabbitohs in the National Rugby League, and represented Lebanon in the 2017 Rugby League World Cup.

Early life
Doueihi was born in Eastwood, New South Wales, Australia, and is of Lebanese descent through his grandparents, who are from Zgharta.

He played his junior rugby league for the Strathfield Raiders and Dundas Shamrocks. He has also a background in rugby union, having represented the Australian Schoolboys while attending St. Patrick's College, Strathfield in 2016. Doueihi is the first cousin once removed of former Australian national rugby union, and later Lebanon, coach Michael Cheika.

Playing career

2017–2019
After playing for the Balmain Tigers in the S. G. Ball Cup for two years, Doueihi signed a two-year contract with the South Sydney Rabbitohs in October 2016. 

In 2017, he played 12 games for the Rabbitohs in the NYC, and was called upon to play for the Rabbitohs' feeder club, the North Sydney Bears, throughout the year.

Doueihi made his international debut for Lebanon against Malta on 6 May 2017. In October 2017, he was named in Lebanon's 24-man squad for the 2017 World Cup. He played in their 32–16 win over Niue in a pre-tournament warm up match, landing 2 from 2 conversions.

Doueihi made his debut for South Sydney in round 2 of the 2018 NRL season against Penrith.  Doueihi made 15 appearances for Souths before suffering a season ending anterior cruciate ligament (ACL) knee injury in their 30–20 victory over Melbourne.

Doueihi made his long awaited return for South Sydney in round 12 of the 2019 NRL season against Parramatta which ended in a 26–14 loss at the new Western Sydney Stadium.

With the signing of Latrell Mitchell for 2020, it left Doueihi on the outer with South Sydney. On 30 January 2020, Doueihi signed a four-year contract to return to his roots at Wests Tigers.

2020
In round 17, he scored two tries and kicked five goals as Wests defeated Manly-Warringah 34–32 at Brookvale Oval.

Douehi played every game for Wests in 2020 as the club finished 11th on the table and missed the finals.

2021
In round 10, Doueihi scored two tries and kicked six goals in Wests Tigers 36–18 victory over Newcastle. In round 16, he scored two tries in a 22–38 defeat against South Sydney.

Despite the Tigers winning just a third of their games, Doueihi scored 174 points in 2021, the fourth most of any player in the competition, and the 7th highest season total ever by a Wests Tigers player.

2022
Doueihi played a total of 11 games for the Wests Tigers in the 2022 NRL season as the club finished bottom of the table and claimed the Wooden Spoon for the first time in their club history.
In the opening match of Lebanon's 2021 Rugby League World Cup campaign, Doueihi was sent off in the second half for dissent during Lebanon's 34-12 loss to New Zealand.
On 19 October, Doueihi was suspended for one match over the incident and would miss Lebanon's second group match against Ireland.

References

External links
Wests Tigers profile
South Sydney Rabbitohs profile
Rabbitohs profile
2017 RLWC profile

1998 births
Living people
Australian rugby league players
Australian people of Lebanese descent
Lebanon national rugby league team players
North Sydney Bears NSW Cup players
Rugby league five-eighths
Rugby league halfbacks
Rugby league players from Sydney
South Sydney Rabbitohs players
Sportsmen from New South Wales
Sportspeople of Lebanese descent
Wests Tigers players